Football Club Infonet Levadia Tallinn, commonly known as FCI Levadia, or simply as Levadia, is a professional football club based in Tallinn, Estonia, that competes in the Meistriliiga, the top flight of Estonian football. The club's home ground is Lilleküla Stadium.

Founded in 1998 in Maardu, the club moved to Tallinn in 2004. Levadia has played in the Meistriliiga since the 1999 season and have never been relegated from the Estonian top division. Levadia have won 10 Meistriliiga titles, a record 9 Estonian Cups and 7 Estonian Supercups. In 2017, Levadia's first team merged with FCI Tallinn, and became FCI Levadia.

History

Early history
Levadia was founded on 22 October 1998, when Viktor Levada's Levadia Group OÜ became the official sponsor of Maardu based Esiliiga club Olümp, which subsequently changed its name to Levadia. The club won the 1998 Esiliiga and were promoted to the Meistriliiga. In January 1999, Sergei Ratnikov was appointed as manager. In 1999, Levadia became the first team to win the Meistriliiga, the Estonian Cup and the Estonian Supercup in the same year. Levadia managed to repeat their success by winning another treble in the following year. In the 2000–01 UEFA Champions League, Levadia defeated Total Network Solutions 2–6 on aggregate in the first qualifying round, but lost to Shakhtar Donetsk 2–9 on aggregate in the second qualifying round. Following the loss to Shakhtar Donetsk, Ratnikov was sacked.

In 2001, Valeri Bondarenko was appointed as a manager. Levadia failed to defend their title, finishing the 2001 season in third place and in November 2001, Bondarenko was replaced by Pasi Rautiainen. Under Rautiainen, Levadia finished the 2002 Meistriliiga as runners-up, only two points behind champions Flora. After the season, Rautiainen resigned and was replaced by Franco Pancheri in January 2003. Pancheri coached Levadia for just 9 Meistriliiga matches, before he was sacked in June 2003. He was replaced by Tarmo Rüütli and Levadia finished the 2003 season in third place.

Relocation to Tallinn
In 2004, Levadia moved to Tallinn, while the club's previously Tallinn-based reserve team changed its name to Levadia II. Under Rüütli, Levadia won the league in the 2004 season, but failed to defend the title in 2005, finishing as runners-up. In the 2006–07 UEFA Cup qualifying rounds, Levadia defeated Haka and Twente, but lost to Newcastle United 1–3 on aggregate in the first round. Still it was the first team an Estonian club managed to reach the first round proper of a European club competition. Levadia won two more Meistriliiga titles in 2006 and 2007. In March 2008, Rüütli was hired by the Estonian Football Association to coach the Estonia national team and his assistant Igor Prins took over as manager. Under Prins, Levadia won two consecutive Meistriliiga titles in 2008 and 2009 and an Estonian Cup in 2010. In August 2010, Prins was sacked due to disagreements with the board and replaced by Levadia II manager Aleksandr Puštov. Levadia finished the 2010 season as runners-up. In July 2011, Puštov was sacked after disappointing results in the Meistriliiga and the Champions League and replaced by Sergei Hohlov-Simson. Levadia finished the 2011 season in fourth place, their lowest ever league placing since the club was promoted to the Meistriliiga.

In December 2011, Marko Kristal was appointed as manager. The club won the 2011–12 Estonian Cup and finished the 2012 season as runners-up. Levadia won the Meistriliiga title in the 2013 season. The team defended their title in 2014, but finished the 2015 season as runners-up. In November 2015, it was announced that Sergei Ratnikov will return to Levadia after 15 years and replace Kristal as manager. Ratnikov's second tenure as Levadia's manager lasted until July 2016, when he was sacked following a 0–1 loss to Pärnu Linnameeskond. He was replaced by another returning manager, Igor Prins. Levadia finished the 2016 season as runners-up.

Merger with FC Infonet 
Following another second-place finish in the 2017 season, Levadia announced they will merge with FC Infonet Tallinn, the Estonian champions of 2016. The two clubs merged their first teams, becoming FCI Levadia, with FCI Tallinn's Aleksandar Rogić taking over as manager. FCI Levadia finished the 2018 season as runners-up, but won the Estonian Cup, beating rivals FC Flora 1–0 in the final. In 2019, Levadia moved to Estonia's largest football stadium A. Le Coq Arena. On 15 September 2019, Rogić was sacked after disappointing results, with assistant coach Vladimir Vassiljev taking over as caretaker manager. In November 2019, former Estonia head coach and record cap holder Martin Reim was appointed as manager. However, after a disappointing start to the season, Martin Reim decided to resign in July 2020 and Vladimir Vassiljev took over the role. 

In August 2020, Levadia's former assistant coach Marko Savić returned to the club and became joint managers with Vassiljev. In the following 2021 season, Levadia ended their 7-year Premium Liiga title drought, becoming Estonian champions in the last day of the season, after drawing 2–2 with rivals FC Flora in the title-deciding final match. FCI Levadia also lifted the Estonian Cup in 2021 and Estonian Super Cup in February 2022, again beating FC Flora in both of the finals. In July 2022, Marko Savić and Vladimir Vassiljev announced they will be stepping down as head coaches of the club, with the main driver for the resignation being the disappointing 6–1 loss against Víkingur Reykjavík in the UEFA Champions League preliminary round. The remainder of the 2022 season was widely described by Estonian media outlets as turbulent, with Levadia changing head coaches multiple times in a short period of time and sporting director Tarmo Kink and CEO Sergei Hohlov-Simson also leaving the club. FCI Levadia finished the 2022 season as runners-up.

Stadiums

Lilleküla Stadium

The club's home ground is the 14,336-seat Lilleküla Stadium (commonly known as A. Le Coq Arena for sponsorship reasons). Opened in 2001 and expanded from 2016 to 2018, it is the largest football stadium in Estonia. The stadium is also home to Levadia's biggest rival FC Flora and the Estonian national team. Lilleküla Stadium is located at Jalgpalli 21, Kesklinn, Tallinn.

Levadia uses Sportland Arena artificial turf for training and home matches during winter and early spring months. Levadia's training in summer and autumn takes place in their Maarjamäe training complex.

Kadriorg Stadium

From 2004 to 2018, Levadia played at Kadriorg Stadium. Built from 1922 to 1926 and renovated from 2000 to 2001, it is one of the oldest football stadiums in Estonia and used to be the home ground of the Estonia national team until the completion of Lilleküla Stadium in 2001.

Players

First-team squad

For season transfers, see transfers summer 2022 and transfers winter 2022–23.

Out on loan

Reserves and academy

Club officials

Coaching staff

Managerial history

Honours

League
 Meistriliiga
 Winners (10): 1999, 2000, 2004, 2006, 2007, 2008, 2009, 2013, 2014, 2021

 Esiliiga
 Winners (1): 1998

Cups
 Estonian Cup
 Winners (10): 1998–99, 1999–2000, 2003–04, 2004–05, 2006–07, 2009–10, 2011–12, 2013–14, 2017–18, 2020–21

 Estonian Supercup
 Winners (8): 1999, 2000, 2001, 2010, 2013, 2015, 2018, 2022

Kit manufacturers and shirt sponsors

Seasons and statistics

Seasons

Europe

References

External links

  
 FCI Levadia at Estonian Football Association

 
1998 establishments in Estonia
Association football clubs established in 1998
Football clubs in Tallinn
Meistriliiga clubs